Triplophysa aquaecaeruleae is a species of stone loach in the genus Triplophysa. It is endemic to China.

References

A
Freshwater fish of China
Endemic fauna of China
Taxa named by Artem Mikhailovich Prokofiev
Fish described in 2001